The men's singles of the 2014 Advantage Cars Prague Open tournament was played on clay in Prague, Czech Republic.

The 2014 Advantage Cars Prague Open singles was a professional tennis tournament played on clay courts. Diego Schwartzman won the tournament, defeating André Ghem 6–4, 7–5

Seeds

Draw

Finals

Top half

Bottom half

References

External Links
 Main Draw
 Qualifying Draw

Advantage Cars Prague Open - Singles
2014 Singles